The discography of Corbin Bleu consists of two studio albums, five singles, five music videos. Bleu has also recorded eleven singles and several other releases as his High School Musical character Chad Danforth in the High School Musical film series' soundtracks. He also pursued a solo career and released his debut album Another Side on May 1, 2007. The album debuted at number thirty-six on the U.S. Billboard 200, selling 18,000 copies in its first week. Bleu released his second album, Speed of Light, on March 10, 2009 in the U.S.

Studio albums

Singles

As featured artists

Other appearances

Music videos

References

External links
Corbin Bleu Official website

Discography
Pop music discographies
Discographies of American artists